Belgium–Philippines relations refers to the bilateral relations between Belgium and the Philippines. Belgium has an embassy in Manila and the Philippines has an embassy in Brussels.

History

Connections between Belgium and the Philippines can be traced back in the Colonial era during the reign of Leopold II of Belgium. Leopold II who just ascended the Belgian throne in 1865 lobbied Queen Isabella II of Spain to cede the Philippines, Spain's sole colony in the Far East, to Belgium in his search to acquire a colony for his country.

Formal diplomatic relations between Belgium and the Philippines was established on July 4, 1946.

Economic relations

During a visit to the Philippines in September 1995, Belgian State Secretary  decided to designate the Philippines as a "partner country" meaning that the country is prioritized as a recipient of  Belgian development assistance. This designation remained until April 2000. Since 1995, Belgium has given the Philippines more than 45 million Euros worth of grants and loans as economic and social development aid to the country.

See also
Foreign relations of Belgium
Foreign relations of the Philippines
Filipinos in Belgium

References

 
Philippines
Belgium